
Gmina Tyszowce is an urban-rural gmina (administrative district) in Tomaszów Lubelski County, Lublin Voivodeship, in eastern Poland.

Villages
Apart from the town of Tyszowce, Gmina Tyszowce contains the villages and settlements of Czartowczyk, Czartowiec, Czartowiec-Kolonia, Czermno, Dębina, Gwoździak, Kaliwy, Kazimierówka, Klątwy, Kolonia, Kolonia Czartowczyk, Kolonia Mikulin, Lipowiec, Marysin, Mikulin, Nowinki, Perespa, Perespa-Kolonia, Pierwszaki, Podbór, Przewale, Rudka, Soból, Trzeciaki, Wakijów, Wojciechówka and Zamłynie.

Neighbouring gminas
Gmina Tyszowce is bordered by the gminas of Komarów-Osada, Łaszczów, Miączyn, Mircze, Rachanie and Werbkowice.

References

Polish official population figures 2006

Tyszowce
Tomaszów Lubelski County